Encyclia adenocarpa is a species of orchid.

References

External links 
 
 

adenocarpa
Orchids of Central America
Orchids of Belize